Naya India(), is an Indian national Hindi daily newspaper. It was founded by Hari Shankar Vyas, senior political journalist, who was formerly the editor of Jansatta  and currently the host cum producer of the Central Hall Programmes on all ETV Hindi news channels. NAYA INDIA was launched on 16 May 2010 from Delhi and is at present published from ten Hindi speaking states.

About the Editor
Mr. Hari Shankar Vyas is the Chief Editor and also the publisher of Naya India. With a rich and diverse experience of 35 years as a journalist, he has become a noted figure in contemporary Hindi Journalism. Starting in the 80s, as part of the core launch team of Jansatta, in the 90s he ventured into publishing and producing TV programmes. His Central Hall show on ETV's all Hindi Channels has had a huge impact not just with the political class of Northern India but is widely watched by the masses. His uninterrupted weekly column Gupshup of 30 years is also one of the oldest and most widely read Political column in Hindi (from Jansatta to Punjab Kesari to Naya India) as well as in English (The Sunday Pioneer). With a desire to fulfill the vacuum the Hindi speaking population feels/ has felt, Mr. Vyas ventured into newspaper publishing, thus creating Naya India.

Editions
NAYA INDIA is published from ten locations—Delhi, Jaipur, Lucknow, Bhopal, Chandigarh, Shimla, Dehradun, Ranchi, Patna and Raipur.

Contributors

 Hari Shankar Vyas
 Ved Pratap Vaidik
 Anil Chaturvedi
 Shruti Vyas
 Balbir Punj
 Satyendra Ranjan
 Ajeet Dwivedi
 Vinamra
 Shambunath Shukla
 Shirish Chandra Mishra
 Sushant Kumar
 Tanmay Kumar
 Sandeep Singh
 Nishant Shekhar
 Ajit Kumar
 Chankyashree
 Abhinav Shrivastava
 Shashank Rai
 Ajay Sethiya

References

External links
Naya India website
Epaper 
NayaIndia TV 

Hindi-language newspapers
Daily newspapers published in India